

Academics 
Islamia College is organized into three divisions, the science, arts and commerce division. These divisions are further categorized as academic departments. The core departments include Commerce, Computer Science, Chemistry, Zoology, Botany, Physics, English, Islamic Studies, Urdu, History, Political Science, Geography, Education, Mathematics, Economics and Statistics.

Building

Library 
A library is near Iqbal Hall in "Old Block".

Blocks 
There are three blocks in the college:
 Old Block- which includes Iqbal Hall and class rooms for intermediate
 BS Block- for undergraduate classes which included Science Labs
 Commerce Block- for commerce classes

Programs 
College is currently offering educational programs at two levels (Intermediate & Undergraduate).

Intermediate 
 F.A.
 F.Sc. (Pre-Medical)
 F.Sc. (Pre-Engineering)
 I.Com
 I.C.S

Undergraduate 
College provides BS Honors (4-Year) co-education program at undergraduate level. College is affiliated with GC University Faisalabad which has allowed these programs:
 BBA
 BS Zoology
 BS Chemistry
 BS English
 BS Computer Science
 BS Mathematics
 BS Physics
 BS Islamiyat
 BS Economics
 BS Commerce

References 

Public universities and colleges in Punjab, Pakistan
Universities and colleges in Faisalabad District
Educational institutions established in 1954
1954 establishments in Pakistan